Itaga is a hill in Tanzania's Tabora Region, located north of the city of Tabora.  The Igombe dam is located near Itaga.

References 

Mountains of Tanzania